Cannabis in Uzbekistan is illegal. Opiates, cannabis, and other plants containing psychotropic substances are illegal.

References

Uzbekistan
Politics of Uzbekistan
Society of Uzbekistan